The New Zealand fernbird or simply fernbird (Poodytes punctatus) is an insectivorous bird endemic to New Zealand.

Taxonomy
The New Zealand fernbird was described by the French zoologists 
Jean Quoy and Joseph Gaimard in 1832 from a specimen collected in Tasman Bay / Te Tai-o-Aorere, South Island, New Zealand. They coined the binomial name, Synallaxis punctata.

In the past, this species had the binomial name Megalurus punctatus. 

There are five subspecies present on different islands. They differ in extent of reddish-brown and intensity  of streaking, as well as size:
 P. p. vealeae (Kemp, R, 1912) – North Island (New Zealand)
 P. p. punctatus (Quoy & Gaimard, 1832) – South Island (New Zealand)
 P. p. stewartianus (Oliver, 1930) – Stewart Island (New Zealand)
 P. p. wilsoni (Stead, 1936) – Codfish Island (=Whenua Hou, west of Stewart Island, New Zealand)
 P. p. caudatus (Buller, 1894) – Snares Island (south of South Island, New Zealand)

The related  Chatham fernbird (Poodytes rufescens), which became extinct around 1900, was sometimes treated as a subspecies of this species.

Description 
The adult has a brown plumage streaked in black. The head, the upperparts and the brown wings are streaked blackish. The long graduated tail is a duller brown, with the rectrices darker. On the underparts, the chin, throat, breast and abdomen are whitish, finely mottled and also streaked blackish on the breast. The flanks, the sides of the chest and the subcaudal covers are brown and streaked blackish, more clearly on the flanks. On the head, the forehead and cap are brown. 

The presence of a whitish eyebrow may be more or less clear. The auricular coverts are grey-brown with darker fine streaks that blend into the brown of the upperparts on the sides of the neck. 

The beak is blackish, with the lower mandible more gray. The eyes are dark brown. Legs and toes are pinkish-brown. Both sexes are similar and the juvenile also looks like the adults.   

The New Zealand fernbird is a rich brown above and white below, with brown spots on both the throat and breast. Early settlers called it the "swamp sparrow", no doubt because of its colouration. The tail feathers are thin, dark brown, and spine-like. The birds reach a length of 18 cm (7 in) ― as measured from tip of beak to end of tail. However, almost half of that is tail.

Ecology 

The New Zealand fernbird is a ground-dwelling bird, and is a reluctant flier, travelling mainly on foot or in occasional short flights of less than 15 metres. In the 19th century, Walter Buller described it as "one of our most common" birds, but it has been adversely affected by the subsequent widespread destruction of its natural wetland habitat following European settlement and is now rare.

The New Zealand fernbird is present in Oceania, mainly in wet shrubby environments with swamps, peat bogs or ponds, plantation areas, temperate shrublands. It occupies an extremely wide area of occurrence at 657,000 km².

The New Zealand fernbird is insectivorous. It feeds on caterpillars, larvae, beetles, flies and moths, as well as small spiders emerging from the cocoon. It sometimes consumes seeds and fruits. 

Its song is a series of rapid whistles and clicks. The contact between the two partners is a duet, a sonorous "uu" for the male, to which the female answers with a high-pitched "tick". The calls are metallic. When disturbed or threatened, the male emits a typical "too-lit" and "di,di,di,di" repeated at a rapid pace.

Breeding 
The birds nest in sedges or other vegetation close to the ground, making a deep woven cup of dried rushes lined with feathers. Breeding occurs from September to February, producing clutches of 2-3 pinkish-white eggs with brown or purple speckles. The Māori phrase "te whare o te mātātā" (a fernbird's house) describes a woven flax cape, made to keep out the weather; a testament to the design and strength of the nest. 

Both adults incubate for about 13 days. The chicks are fed small insects by the parents. They leave the nest after 15-17 days and sometimes at 20-21 days after hatching. They can breed as early as 9 months of age. Pairs raise between 1 and 3 broods. Juveniles still depend on the parents for food for a few weeks after leaving the nest.

Place in Māori culture 

Māori revered the fernbird as an "oracle" or "wise bird" (Manu tohu). The calls of the bird were interpreted as heralding success or failure in daily activities such as fishing, but on a more serious level they could also portend prosperity and health or disaster and death.

Conservation status 
Although the population is in decline, it is considered by the IUCN as a species of Least Concern.

New Zealand fernbird populations are affected by wetland drainage and rat predation.

Notes

References 

 Falla, R.A., Sibson, R.B., and Turbott, E.G. (1970). A Field Guide to the Birds of New Zealand. London: Collins. 
 Marshall, J., Kinsky, F.C., and Robinson, C.J.R. (1982). The Fiat Book of Common birds in New Zealand. Wellington: A.H. and A.W. Reed.

External links 

 http://www.nzbirdsonline.org.nz/species/fernbird

Endemic birds of New Zealand
Poodytes
Birds described in 1832
Taxa named by Jean René Constant Quoy
Taxa named by Joseph Paul Gaimard